Anatoliy Antonovich Polishchuk (11 January 1950 – 7 June 2016) was a Ukrainian former volleyball player who competed for the Soviet Union in the 1976 Summer Olympics.

In 1976 he was part of the Soviet team which won the silver medal in the Olympic tournament. He played all five matches.

External links
 profile

1950 births
2016 deaths
Ukrainian men's volleyball players
Soviet men's volleyball players
Olympic volleyball players of the Soviet Union
Volleyball players at the 1976 Summer Olympics
Olympic silver medalists for the Soviet Union
Olympic medalists in volleyball
Medalists at the 1976 Summer Olympics
Sportspeople from Rivne Oblast